is a passenger railway station located in the city of Ōsakasayama, Osaka Prefecture, Japan, operated by the private railway operator Nankai Electric Railway. It has the station number "NK65".

Lines

Layout
The station consists of two ground-level opposed side platforms. The platforms are not connected, and passengers wishing to change platforms must exit the station and re-enter.

Platforms

Adjacent stations

History
Ōsakasayamashi Station opened on July 5, 1917 as }. It was renamed  } on April 1, 1950 and to its present name on December 23, 2000.

Passenger statistics
In fiscal 2019, the station was used by an average of 9,494 passengers daily.

Surrounding area
 Ōsakasayama City Hall
 Sayama Jin'ya Ruins
 Sayama pond

See also
 List of railway stations in Japan

References

External links

  Ōsakasayamashi Station from Nankai Electric Railway website 

Railway stations in Japan opened in 1917
Railway stations in Osaka Prefecture
 Ōsakasayama